Brian Donald Blain (13 September 1936 – July 1994) was an Australian actor, best known for his roles in numerous TV series and films starting from the early 1970s.

Career
Blain is best remembered for his role in the Seven Network soap opera Sons and Daughters from 1982 to 1987 as Gordon Hamilton and his role as Captain Jacob Hilliard in the film sequel Return to the Blue Lagoon (1991). In that same year, he also starred opposite Anne Haddy playing Michael Daniels, a love interest of her character Helen Daniels in the Network Ten soap opera Neighbours. Only a few years previously Haddy had played his housekeeper Rosie in Sons and Daughters.

Blain, apart from television and film roles, also worked in theatre, notably The National Theatre in Perth, Western Australia and the Queensland Theatre Company

Blain was injured in a motorcycle accident in 1990. He died from a heart attack in July 1994, at the age of 57.

Filmography

References

External links
 

1936 births
1994 deaths
20th-century Australian male actors
Australian male soap opera actors